Sofía Lama (born Sofía Lama Stamatiades on June 9, 1987, in Puebla, Mexico) is a Mexican actress of Greek descent.

Life

Sofia Lama was born in Puebla, Mexico, a state in the center of Mexico. She started acting at the age of 11 and was the star of several TV shows for children including Disney Club with Disney Channel Mexico.

At the age of 18 Sofia moved to Mexico City. She starred in the musical "Grease" playing "Frenchie" and toured successfully throughout Mexico. She continued her passion for theater and had lead roles in several plays in Mexico City such as "Las Arpias" & "El ultimo Aliento". Sofia also studied film for 3 years at the Estudios Cinematograficos INIDI. She took acting classes with Adriana Barraza (Oscar nominated for BABEL) and studied with Juan Carlos Corazza (Spain).

Sofia worked consistently in Mexican television before getting the opportunity to travel to Miami and begin her career in the U.S. Hispanic Market.

With now over 12 Series Regular credits under her belt, Sofia has become one of the most well known faces in both Latin America and the U.S. Hispanic Market. Her  series with NBC Universal/Telemundo include Pecados ajenos, Sin senos no hay paraíso, La casa de al lado & Dueños del paraíso (where she starred opposite Kate Del Castillo & Adriana Barraza) have aired in more than 100 countries worldwide and streamed on Netflix.

One of Sofia's most important roles was "Alicia Gonzalez" in the acclaimed and popular Univision series "Eva Luna". Its finale drew more than 9.1 million viewers in the U.S. and she became one of the most popular young actresses in the Latin Market.

Sofia had the lead role of "Fernanda" in the 2015 film "Desde El Mas Alla" which she also produced. The film was a critical success and toured in film festivals in Mexico. That same year she played 'Vanessa' in the romantic comedy "Enamorandome de Abril".

In 2016 she played "Elizabeth Cardenas", one of the series regulars on "Eva La Trailera" for NBC Universal/Telemundo.

In 2017 she will star in the Fox International/Telemexico series "Guerra De Idolos". The story revolves around the death of a regional Mexican music idol and showcases the lives of those who manage and control the Latin music business in the U.S.

Filmography

References

External links 
 

1987 births
Living people
Mexican child actresses
Mexican telenovela actresses
Mexican television actresses
Mexican film actresses
Mexican stage actresses
Actresses from Puebla
21st-century Mexican actresses
Mexican people of Greek descent
People educated at Centro de Estudios y Formación Actoral
Mexican expatriates in the United States